Culture Clash may refer to:
 Cultural conflict
 Culture Clash (performance troupe), American performance troupe
 Culture Clash (album), by The Aristocrats
 Culture Clash (band), British band that plays Harare Jit music
 The Mole: Culture Clash, Australian television series